Shadab Kamal is an Indian actor. He played the male lead in the 2012 film B.A. Pass, opposite Shilpa Shukla. He also acted in the 2018 film Gaon:The Village No More.

Career
Indian actor Shadab Kamal began his career in 2011 with the movie Sugar Baby. Following which the actor went on to make his lead role debut in 2013 with Ajay Bahl`s B.A. Pass which received critical acclaim and won the Best Film Award in the `Indian competition` section at the 2012 Osian's Cinefan Festival of Asian and Arab Cinema. Shadab also received Best Actor award the event. The actor has since then appeared in movies such as Meeruthiya Gangsters (2015), Har Har Byomkesh (2015), and Gaon (2017). His 2018 release includes Gaon: The Village No More, directed by Gautam Singh. He acted in movie Upstarts which was released in 2019.

Filmography

Films

Web series

References

External links 

 

1993 births
Living people
Male actors in Hindi cinema
Male actors in Bengali cinema